Companilactobacillus is a genus of lactic acid bacteria.

Species
The genus Companilactobacillus comprises the following species:

 Companilactobacillus alimentarius (Reuter 1983) Zheng et al. 2020
 Companilactobacillus allii (Jung et al. 2017) Zheng et al. 2020
 Companilactobacillus baiquanensis (Wei and Gu 2019) Zheng et al. 2020
 Companilactobacillus bobalius (Mañes-Lázaro et al. 2008) Zheng et al. 2020
 Companilactobacillus crustorum (Scheirlinck et al. 2007) Zheng et al. 2020
 Companilactobacillus farciminis (Reuter 1983) Zheng et al. 2020
 Companilactobacillus formosensis (Chang et al. 2015) Zheng et al. 2020
 Companilactobacillus furfuricola (Irisawa et al. 2014) Zheng et al. 2020
 Companilactobacillus futsaii (Chao et al. 2012) Zheng et al. 2020
 Companilactobacillus ginsenosidimutans Zheng et al. 2020
 Companilactobacillus halodurans Zheng et al. 2020
 Companilactobacillus heilongjiangensis (Gu et al. 2013) Zheng et al. 2020
 Companilactobacillus huachuanensis (Fu and Gu 2019) Zheng et al. 2020
 Companilactobacillus hulinensis (Wei and Gu 2019) Zheng et al. 2020
 Companilactobacillus insicii (Ehrmann et al. 2016) Zheng et al. 2020
 Companilactobacillus jidongensis (Wei and Gu 2019) Zheng et al. 2020
 Companilactobacillus kedongensis (Wei and Gu 2019) Zheng et al. 2020
 Companilactobacillus keshanensis (Wei and Gu 2019) Zheng et al. 2020
 Companilactobacillus kimchiensis (Kim et al. 2013) Zheng et al. 2020
 Companilactobacillus kimchii (Yoon et al. 2000) Zheng et al. 2020
 Companilactobacillus metriopterae (Chiba et al. 2018) Zheng et al. 2020
 Companilactobacillus mindensis (Ehrmann et al. 2003) Zheng et al. 2020
 Companilactobacillus mishanensis (Wei and Gu 2019) Zheng et al. 2020
 Companilactobacillus musae (Chen et al. 2017) Zheng et al. 2020
 Companilactobacillus nantensis (Valcheva et al. 2006) Zheng et al. 2020
 Companilactobacillus nodensis (Kashiwagi et al. 2009) Zheng et al. 2020
 Companilactobacillus nuruki (Heo et al. 2018) Zheng et al. 2020
 Companilactobacillus pabuli Jung et al. 2021
 Companilactobacillus paralimentarius (Cai et al. 1999) Zheng et al. 2020
 Companilactobacillus salsicarnum Zheng et al. 2020
 Companilactobacillus suantsaicola Zheng et al. 2020
 Companilactobacillus tucceti (Chenoll et al. 2009) Zheng et al. 2020
 Companilactobacillus versmoldensis (Kröckel et al. 2003) Zheng et al. 2020
 Companilactobacillus zhachilii (Zhang et al. 2019) Zheng et al. 2020
 Companilactobacillus zhongbaensis (Wei and Gu 2019) Zheng et al. 2020

Phylogeny
The currently accepted taxonomy is based on the List of Prokaryotic names with Standing in Nomenclature and the phylogeny is based on whole-genome sequences.

References

Lactobacillaceae
Bacteria genera